Mumtaz Hussain Khan is a Pakistani politician who has been a member of the Provincial Assembly of Sindh since August 2018. He previously served in this role from May 2013 to May 2018.

Early life 
He was born on 8 March 1973 in Jacobabad Taluka.

Political career

He was elected to the Provincial Assembly of Sindh as a candidate of Pakistan Peoples Party (PPP) from Constituency PS-13 Jacobabad-I in the 2013 Sindh provincial election.

He was re-elected to Provincial Assembly of Sindh as a candidate of PPP from PS-3 (Jacobabad-III) in the 2018 Sindh provincial election.

References

Living people
Sindh MPAs 2013–2018
1973 births
Pakistan People's Party MPAs (Sindh)
Sindh MPAs 2018–2023